It's the Easter Beagle, Charlie Brown!  is the 12th prime-time animated TV special based on the comic strip Peanuts by Charles M. Schulz. In the United States, it debuted on CBS on April 9, 1974 at 8 PM.

It's the Easter Beagle, Charlie Brown received an Emmy nomination for Outstanding Children's Special at the 27th Primetime Emmy Awards in 1975. It was one of two Peanuts specials nominated that year, along with Be My Valentine, Charlie Brown, but they both lost to Yes, Virginia, there is a Santa Claus (another Bill Melendez production).

Summary
While most of the Peanuts gang is busy getting ready for Easter, Linus futilely tries to convince them that it is all a waste of time, and that the "Easter Beagle" will take care of everything. Only Charlie Brown's sister, Sally, believes him, although she remains skeptical after their Great Pumpkin misadventure on Halloween.

Peppermint Patty and Marcie attempt to color Easter eggs, but as it is Marcie's first time, she does not know how. Their first attempt fails as Marcie fries all the eggs on a griddle (making fried eggs).  The second attempt fails when she tries cooking more eggs on a waffle iron (for 4 of the eggs), then in a toaster (for 1 of them, which is unsuccessful because the egg cannot fit in one of the toaster's slots), and roasting the remaining 8 (the same egg she tried toasting, and the remaining 7) in the oven. In the third and final attempt, Peppermint Patty spends the last of her allowance on a third carton of eggs. After she spends the last of her money with it, she explains to Marcie that the eggs are supposed to be boiled. Marcie boils them as told, but she again does it incorrectly (instead of keeping the shell on, she cracks the eggs out of the shells into a pot of water). Outraged, Peppermint Patty screams to Marcie that she made egg soup. At the end, Peppermint Patty has spent her whole allowance, is out of money, and cannot buy any more eggs. So Peppermint Patty and Marcie end up with no colored eggs and can't make any more attempts.  

Woodstock wakes up shivering in his nest after a cold spring rain. He goes for help to Snoopy, who buys him a birdhouse. At first Woodstock hates it, but soon makes it over into a swinging bachelor pad, complete with television, contemporary artwork, a sunken bed, modern furniture, and a quadrophonic stereo system. Curious to see more of the inside, Snoopy gets his nose stuck in the entry hole and accidentally shatters the birdhouse, and so he buys Woodstock another house.

Much to Schroeder's chagrin, Lucy believes that Easter is the "gift-getting season", so she decides to have her own private Easter egg hunt, painting and then hiding the eggs herself to find them on Easter morning (using a paper pad and pencil to write down their locations).  But unknown to her, Snoopy follows close behind and snatches up each one.  Easter morning arrives, and so does the Easter Beagle, tossing eggs to everyone including Woodstock in his new birdhouse, to Lucy (whose hand Snoopy furtively shakes), and even Peppermint Patty and Marcie.  But by the time he gets to Charlie Brown, Snoopy has run out of eggs.

When everyone (minus Charlie Brown) has received an Easter egg from the "Easter beagle" (Snoopy), Marcie then asks Peppermint Patty what they should do with their eggs now that they have them. Peppermint Patty instructs Marcie that after you receive the eggs, you put a little salt on the eggs and eat them. Marcie does so (without removing the shell) and says that it tasted terrible which makes Patty face-palm. After the Easter Beagle's visit, Sally becomes a believer. But as for Lucy, she quickly realizes that the Easter Beagle gave her one of her own eggs. Because of that, she is still brooding about it ten weeks later, and Linus suggests that she go and talk about it with Snoopy. She visits Snoopy's doghouse to pick a fight, but Snoopy takes the fight out of her with a disarming kiss on the cheek. Lucy smiles at that because Easter still made her happy.

Voice cast
Todd Barbee as Charlie Brown 
Melanie Kohn as Lucy van Pelt
Stephen Shea as Linus van Pelt
Greg Felton as Schroeder
Linda Ercoli as Peppermint Patty
Lynn Mortensen as Sally Brown
Jimmy Ahrens as Marcie
Bill Melendez as Snoopy/Woodstock

Production notes

Music score
The score was recorded by the Vince Guaraldi Quartet on February 12, 20, 26 and March 14, 1974, at Wally Heider Studios, featuring Guaraldi (piano, electric piano, electric harpsichord, electric guitar), Seward McCain (electric bass), Tom Harrell (trumpet) and Eliot Zigmund (drums).

"Peppermint Patty"
"Easter Theme"
"Piano Sonata No. 3 in C Major, Opus 2: I. Allegro con brio" (Ludwig van Beethoven)
"Snoopy and Woodstock" (aka Cue 4; version 1)
"Linus and Lucy" (bridge section; version 1)
"Woodstock's Dream" (version 1)
"Background No. 1" (gumball interlude)
"Easter Theme" (first reprise, bunny-wunnie dance)
"Woodstock's Dream" (version 2)
"Snoopy and Woodstock" (version 2)
"Background No. 2 (pumpkin patch interlude)
"Kitchen Music" (version 1)
"Linus and Lucy" (bridge section; version 2)
"Woodstock's Pad"
"Woodstock's Dream" (interior mall vamp; version 3)
"Minuet in G Major, BWV Anh. 116" (Music Box dance) (Johann Sebastian Bach)
"Woodstock's Dream" (alternate interior vamp; version 4)
"Kitchen Music" (version 2, aka Cue 19, Take 1)
"Linus and Lucy" (version 1)
"Linus and Lucy" (version 2)
"Symphony No. 7 in A Major, Opus. 92: II. Allegretto" (Ludwig van Beethoven)
"Symphony No. 7 in A Major, Opus. 92: I. Poco sostenuto – Vivace" (Ludwig van Beethoven)
"Background No. 3"
"Linus and Lucy" (bridge section; version 3)
"Easter Theme" (second reprise, end credits)

No official soundtrack for It's the Easter Beagle, Charlie Brown  has been released. However, in the mid-2000s, recording session master tapes for seven 1970s-era Peanuts television specials scored by Guaraldi were discovered by his son, David Guaraldi. This resulted in the release of "Snoopy and Woodstock" (aka Cue 4; version 1) and "Kitchen Music" (version 2, aka Cue 19, Take 1) being released on the compilation album, Vince Guaraldi and the Lost Cues from the Charlie Brown Television Specials, Volume 2 (2008). In addition, a live version of "Woodstock's Pad" (mistitled "Then Came You") was also released in 2008 on Live on the Air from a Vince Guaraldi Trio concert originally recorded on February 6, 1974 (two years to the day before Guaraldi's untimely death).

Voice talent
It's the Easter Beagle, Charlie Brown was the last special for Todd Barbee; He would be replaced by Duncan Watson.

Television
CBS aired It's the Easter Beagle, Charlie Brown annually during each Easter season from 1974 to 2000.

ABC ran the special annually on ABC from 2001 up to April 11, 2006. In 2007, the network, without any explanation, did not air the program, but it returned on March 18, 2008, as filler programming against American Idol. The TV special was watched by 6.32 million viewers, in fourth place behind Idol, NCIS and The Biggest Loser, and fifth place if Spanish-language Univision is counted. ABC didn't air the special in 2011 or 2012, but it aired on Easter Sunday 2013 along with Charlie Brown's All-Stars (1966), watched by 2.56 million people, tied for fourth place behind the end of the NCAA Championship Basketball Game between Duke and Louisville and a rerun of The Voice. The special aired again with Charlie Brown's All-Stars on Easter Sunday in 2014.  To date this is the last broadcast airing of the special.

Beginning with the 2021 season, Apple TV+ will hold exclusive rights to the special along with all other Peanuts productions. It was not included among the specials that Apple TV+ must provide for free in short windows surrounding their holidays (or to PBS for free over-the-air airings) and thus it will only be available to subscribers.

Home media
It's the Easter Beagle, Charlie Brown was released to DVD twice, first on March 4, 2003 by Paramount Home Entertainment and again on February 19, 2008 on a Remastered Deluxe Edition DVD from Warner Home Video. It was also released in the UK by Firefly Entertainment in 2004, with Life Is a Circus, Charlie Brown.

Earlier home media releases of It's the Easter Beagle, Charlie Brown have, in the past, been available in 1982 on the CED format, on VHS in 1986 and 1988 from Media Home Entertainment and subsidiary Hi-Tops Video, respectively and by Paramount Home Video on March 9, 1994 in a slipcover package and on October 1, 1996 in clamshell packaging.

References

External links
 

Peanuts television specials
Easter television specials
Television shows directed by Phil Roman
1970s American television specials
1970s animated television specials
CBS original programming
1974 television specials
1974 in American television
CBS television specials
Television shows written by Charles M. Schulz